Middleton Cemetery and Crematorium is a cemetery in Boarshaw Road, Middleton, Greater Manchester, England.

The cemetery was established in 1912 and is owned and maintained by Rochdale Metropolitan Borough Council. Facilities on the grounds include a crematorium, chapel, toilets, a memorial garden and a book of remembrance room.

Interments 
 Joel Halliwell (1881–1958), recipient of the Victoria Cross in World War I
 Lee Rigby (1987–2013), British Army Fusilier, killed by Islamic extremists in London, May 2013.
 24 graves of military personnel maintained by the Commonwealth War Graves Commission, 6 from World War I, 18 from World War II.

References

External links
 

1912 establishments in England
Cemeteries in Greater Manchester
Buildings and structures in the Metropolitan Borough of Rochdale